Rhea County (pronounced  ) is a county located in the U.S. state of Tennessee. As of the 2020 census, the population was 32,870. Its county seat is Dayton. Rhea County comprises the Dayton, TN Micropolitan Statistical Area, which is also included in the Chattanooga-Cleveland-Dalton, TN-GA-AL Combined Statistical Area.

History
Rhea County is named for the Tennessee politician and Revolutionary War veteran John Rhea.

A portion of the Trail of Tears ran through the county as part of the United States government's removal of the Cherokee in the 1830s.

During the American Civil War, Rhea County was one of the few counties in East Tennessee that was heavily sympathetic to the cause of the Confederate States of America. It was the only East Tennessee county that did not send a delegate to the pro-Union East Tennessee Convention in 1861. The county voted in favor of Tennessee's June 1861 Ordinance of Secession, 360 votes to 202.  Rhea raised seven companies for the Confederate Army, compared to just one company for the Union.

Rhea had the only female cavalry company on either side during the Civil War.  It was made up of young women in their teens and their twenties from Rhea County and was formed in 1862. Their unit was named the Rhea County Spartans. Until 1863, the Spartans simply visited loved ones in the military and delivered the equivalent of modern-day care packages. After Union troops entered Rhea in 1863, the Spartans may have engaged in some spying for Confederate forces. The members of the Spartans were arrested in April 1865 under orders of a Rhea County Unionist and were forced to march to the Tennessee River. From there they were transported to Chattanooga aboard the USS Chattanooga. Once in Chattanooga, Union officers realized the women were not a threat and ordered them released and returned to Rhea County. They first were required to take the oath of allegiance to the United States government. The Spartans were not an officially recognized unit of the Confederate Army.

In 1890, the county seat was moved from the Washington community to its present location in Dayton. This was a result of several causes such as the completion of the Cincinnati-Chattanooga Railroad in Smith's Crossroads, the rapid growth of Chattanooga, the detrimental effects of the American Civil War, and the emigration of its prominent citizens.

The Scopes Trial, which resulted from the teaching of evolution being banned in Tennessee public schools under the Butler Act, took place in Rhea County in 1925. The trial was one of the first to be referred to as the "Trial of the century". William Jennings Bryan played a role as prosecutor in trial, and he died in Dayton shortly after the trial ended.  A statue of Bryan was recently erected on the grounds of the Rhea County Courthouse.

In 1956, the State Supreme Court upheld a "regular and customary practice among certain of the teachers, during the regular school hours and in the classrooms, to read, or have some pupil read from, the Bible; to ask questions of the pupils concerning the content of such passages; to repeat prayers, usually that prayer known as the Lord's Prayer as it appears in the sixth Chapter of the Book of Matthew in the King James version of the Bible; to sing hymns and other religious songs; and to inquire of the pupils as to their attendance or non-attendance at Sunday School," where Sunday School attendance remained compulsory in Tennessee at the time, though that law was apparently—to some teachers chagrin—no longer being enforced. The court there held that precluding teachers from doing so violated the State Constitution, Article 1, § 3: That all men have a natural and indefeasible right to worship Almighty God according to the dictates of their own conscience; that no man can of right be compelled to attend, erect, or support any place of worship, or to maintain any minister against his consent; that no human authority can, in any case whatever, control or interfere with the rights of conscience; and that no preference shall ever be given, by law, to any religious establishment or mode of worship. The court then held that it exceeded the Equal Protection guarantees of the 14th Amendment of the U.S. Constitution "to have their children taught what they desire ... subject to qualification that teachers and places must be reputable and things taught not immoral or inimical to public welfare," a reading of that Amendment that has since been overruled as to religious teaching in schools by both the Colorado court which provided the quotation, and by the U.S. Supreme Court. But at the time, the State Supreme Court reasoned: "complainants, we feel that they have taken a rather narrow and dogmatic view of these constitutional inhibitions. In their commendable zeal in behalf of liberty of conscience, and of religious worship, they have overlooked the broader concept that religion per se is something which transcends all man-made creeds."  On June 8, 2004, a federal appeals court upheld a ruling banning further Bible instructions as a violation of the First Amendment principle of "Separation of church and state".

On March 16, 2004, Rhea County commissioner J.C. Fugate prompted a vote on a ban on homosexuals in Tennessee, allowing the county to charge them with "crimes against nature". The measure passed, 8–0. Several of the commissioners who voted for the resolution chose not to run for reelection or were voted out of office. The resolution was withdrawn on March 18. In protest, a "Gay Day in Rhea" was held on May 8, 2004, with about 400 participants.

Geography

Walden Ridge, part of the Cumberland Plateau, provides Rhea County's border with Bledsoe County to the west.  The Tennessee River forms Rhea's border with Meigs County to the east.  Whites Creek, a tributary of the Tennessee River, forms Rhea's border with Roane County to the north.  Watts Bar Dam straddles the Tennessee River near Spring City.  The section of the river upstream from the dam is part of Watts Bar Lake, and the section downstream is part of Chickamauga Lake.  A nuclear power plant, Watts Bar Nuclear Generating Station, is located near Watts Bar Dam.

The major north–south road in Rhea County is U.S. Route 27.  Major east–west roads include State Route 30, which intersects US-27 in Dayton, and State Route 68, which connects Spring City with Madisonville and Crossville.

Adjacent counties
Cumberland County (northwest/CST Border)
Roane County (northeast)
Meigs County (east)
Hamilton County (south)
Bledsoe County (west/CST Border)

State protected areas
Chickamauga Wildlife Management Area (part)
Cumberland Trail (part)
Hiwassee Refuge (part)
Laurel-Snow State Natural Area
Piney Falls State Natural Area
Stringing Fork Falls State Natural Area
Yuchi Refuge

Demographics

2020 census

As of the 2020 United States census, there were 32,870 people, 12,177 households, and 8,235 families residing in the county.

2000 census
As of the census of 2000, there were 28,400 people, 11,184 households, and 8,108 families residing in the county.  The population density was 90 people per square mile (35/km2).  There were 12,565 housing units at an average density of 40 per square mile (15/km2).  The racial makeup of the county was 95.41% White, 2.04% Black or African American, 0.39% Native American, 0.29% Asian, 0.04% Pacific Islander, 0.75% from other races, and 1.08% from two or more races.  1.67% of the population were Hispanic or Latino of any race.

There were 11,184 households, out of which 31.20% had children under the age of 18 living with them, 57.40% were married couples living together, 11.20% had a female householder with no husband present, and 27.50% were non-families. 23.80% of all households were made up of individuals, and 9.90% had someone living alone who was 65 years of age or older.  The average household size was 2.46 and the average family size was 2.90.

In the county, the population was spread out, with 23.70% under the age of 18, 10.00% from 18 to 24, 27.50% from 25 to 44, 25.00% from 45 to 64, and 13.80% who were 65 years of age or older.  The median age was 37 years. For every 100 females there were 94.30 males.  For every 100 females age 18 and over, there were 91.70 males.

The median income for a household in Rhea County was $28,418, and the median income for a family was $33,580. Males had a median income of $21,066 versus $16,063 for females. The per capita income for the county was $15,672.  About 34.7% of the population were below the poverty line, including 19.00% of those under age 18 and 15.20% of those age 65 or over.

Government

Rhea County uses the county commission form of local government. There are nine seats on the county commission, each representing a geographical area of the county. Members of the commission and the county mayor are elected to four year terms.

Rhea County is part of the 3rd Congressional District of Tennessee. Until 2003, Rhea County was part of the 4th Congressional District, and was represented by Rhea County native Van Hilleary. Hilleary ran unsuccessfully for governor in 2002. Beginning in 2013, Rhea County again became part of the 4th District.

At the state level, Rhea County is part of the 31st district of the Tennessee House of Representatives. The 31st is made up of Rhea County and the northern portion of Hamilton County. The county is part of the 12th district in the Tennessee Senate.

Rhea County is generally a Republican-leaning county in Presidential elections and in congressional elections. The county voted for John McCain in 2008. The last Democrat to win a majority in the county was Jimmy Carter in 1976. On account of the third-party candidacy of Ross Perot, the Republican candidate received less than fifty percent in the 1992 and in 1996. Ross Perot drew 11.2% and 7.6% of the vote in 1992 and 1996, respectively.

Education
Rhea County Schools, the county-administered public school system, serves most Rhea County students. The system operates three elementary schools, two middle schools, two K-8 schools, one high school (Rhea County High School), and one alternative school. The K-8 school, Rhea Central Elementary, is currently the largest K-8 school in the state of Tennessee in terms of number of students.

The City of Dayton operates a K-8 school, Dayton City School, that serves the children who live within the city limits.  All public school students in the county, however, attend Rhea County High School, in Evensville, upon leaving the eighth grade, as the city does not have a high school. The high school has an enrollment of approximately 1,500 students.

Rhea County Academy is a private, not-for-profit K4-12 school located in Dayton. The school was started in 2003 and currently enrolls approximately 150 students.

Bryan College, a four-year Christian liberal arts college, has its campus in Dayton.  The college is named for William Jennings Bryan.  Chattanooga State Community College also has a small satellite campus in Dayton.  Additionally, Oxford Graduate School, an international graduate level Christian college serving working adults has its campus in Dayton.

Communities

City
 Dayton (county seat)

Towns
 Graysville
 Spring City

Unincorporated communities
 Evensville
 Five Points
 Grandview
 Liberty Hill
 Ogden
 Old Washington

Former community
 Rhea Springs

Notable people
 Archie Butler (actor), an actor, stunt man, and crewman in numerous films and television shows, was born here on September 27, 1911.
 Hargus "Pig" Robbins (musician), an American session keyboard and piano player was born here on January 18, 1938.
 Arnim LeRoy Fox, better known as Curly Fox, was an American old-time and country fiddler, singer, and country musician that was born here on November 9, 1910.
 John Randolph Neal Jr. was an American attorney, law professor, politician, and activist who was born here on September 17, 1876.

See also
 National Register of Historic Places listings in Rhea County, Tennessee

References

External links

 
 

 
Counties of Appalachia
1807 establishments in Tennessee
Populated places established in 1807
East Tennessee